The NASA Distinguished Public Service Medal is an award similar to the NASA Distinguished Service Medal, but awarded to non-government personnel. This is the highest honor NASA awards to anyone who was not a government employee when the service was performed.

Recipients

1967
Dr. Charles Stark Draper

1969

 Harry H. Hess
 T. J. O'Malley
 Frederick Seitz
 Charles H. Townes
 Russell L. Schweickart
 Frank Borman

1971
 Joseph G. Gavin
 George E. Stoner

1972

 Riccardo Giacconi
 Brian O'Brien
 Gerald J. Wasserburg

1973

 Paul B. Blasingame
 Joseph F. Clayton
 Leo Goldberg
 Clinton H. Grace
 Robert E. Greer
 George W. Jeffs
 Thomas J. Kelly
 H. Douglas Lowrey
 Joseph P. McNamara
 James A. Miller
 Richard H. Nelson
 Frank Press
 Theodore D. Smith

1974

 Ben G. Bromberg
 Jack M. Campbell
 Edwin G. Czarnecki
 Harry Dornbrand
 Jesse L. Greenstein
 Bruce C. Murray
 T. J. O'Malley
 William G. Purdy

1975

 Grant L. Hansen
 Willis M. Hawkins
 Richard B. Kershner

1976
 Edward W. Bonnett
 Antonio Ferri
 Theodore D. Smith
 Lyman Spitzer

1977

 Laurence J. Adams
 Franklin W. Kolk
 Walter O. Lowrie
 Thomas G. Pownall
 Carl Sagan
 Francis B. Sayre
 Ronald Smelt
 Kurt Waldheim

1978
 Edward O. Buckbee
 Gerald J. Wasserburg

1980
 Clyde W. Tombaugh

1981
 Victor van Lint

1982
Harrison H. Schmitt

1983

 Eugene H. Levy

1984
 Erik Quistgaard
 Nichelle Nichols

1988
 Robert Heinlein
 Carver G. Kennedy

1991
 John T. Radecki
 Rodger Doxsey
 Harlan James Smith
 Bert R. Bulkin

1992
 John Bahcall
Berrien Moore III

1993
 Riccardo Giacconi
 Gene Roddenberry

1995
 Dr. Robert L. Golden
 Bill G Aldridge

1996
Lori Garver

1997

 Norman Ralph Augustine

2001
 Alain Bensoussan 
 James (Jim) F. Berry
 Yvonne Brill

2002
 Thomas P. Ackerman
 Viktor D. Blagov
 Richard D. Blomberg
 Vladimir Nikolaevich Dezhurov
 Glenn A. Goerke
 Audrey Milroy
 R. K. Chetty Pandipati
 Gerald W. Smith
 Mikhail Tyurin
 Yury V. Usachev

2003
 Daniel J. Jacob
 Roger J. Bressenden
 Hugh (Hamp) Wilson
 Roger Chrostowski
 Barry Greenberg
 Ilan Ramon
 Yuri Gidzenko

2004
 Neil deGrasse Tyson
 Edward C. "Pete" Aldridge
 Maria T. Zuber
Dr. Laurie Leshin
Albert Reville
William H. Webster

2005
 William Sample
 Richard Covey
Dr. Douglas Stanley
Dr. Dennis L. Hartmann

2006
 Daniel J. Heimerdinger, Ph.D.
 Bob Bishop, D.S.
 Bruce H. Wendler

2007
Jim Banke
David F. Dinges
Paul Lightsey
Lynda Weatherman
2008
 Dr. Klaus P. Heiss
James R. Bathurst
 James J. Cawby
 George Hartig
 Mark G. Jager
 Linn Leblanc
 Michael J. Massie 
 Robert J. Puckett
 Ted Robinson 
 Harold R. Ross 
 Marcus Shaw 
 Carl Weimer, Ph.D.

2009
 Dr. Carlos T. Mata
 Brian Rishikof
 Lester M. Cohen
 Roger W. Corson

2010
 Dennis E. Botts
Jack Trombka
Benjamin M. Herman
 Jeffrey P. Sutton

2011
 Gary Dempsey - COLSA
 Charles Kopicz - ERC, Inc
 Robert Savoie - GEOCENT

2012
 Robert Berry
 Raymond M. Hoff
 Peter W. Phillips
 Dmitry Kondratyev
 James Sponnick, United Launch Alliance
 Michael L. Young, United Launch Alliance

2013
The following individuals were recognized in 2013.  Individuals marked with an * was awarded between 1 April 2012 and 31 March 2013, outside the timing of the normal awards cycle. 

 Edward C. Stone

2014
The following individuals were recognized in 2014.  Individuals marked with an * was awarded between April 1, 2013 and May 31, 2014, outside the timing of the normal awards cycle.

2015
 Davy A. Haynes, Jacobs Technologies ESSSA Group, Engineering Directorate

2016
The following individuals were recognized June 28, 2016.
 Thomas A. Glavich
 Stamatios Krimigis
 Stephen E. Kulczycki
 Therrin H. Protze
Alan Stern

2017
The following individuals were recognized June 15, 2017.

2018
The following individuals were recognized August 2, 2018.

2019
The following individuals were recognized August 28, 2019.

Unknown date

See also 
 List of NASA awards

References

External links
 NASA Medals directory
 National Aeronautics and Space Administration Honor Awards (1969–1978)

Awards and decorations of NASA
Distinguished service awards